Anil Kamath is a web and technology entrepreneur. He is the founder of eBoodle.com and of Efficient Frontier. Kamath holds the patent on use of modern portfolio theory to the field of online advertising.

Personal life and education 
Originally from Bombay, India, Kamath has a PhD in Computer Science from Stanford University and a Bachelor of Technology in Computer Science from IIT Bombay. He completed his schooling from St. Pauls High School Dadar, Bombay and his junior college education from D.G. Ruparel College, Bombay.

Career 
Kamath worked at Bell Labs and did his PhD in the area of Mathematical optimization. Kamath used his PhD work in the area of optimization to build quantitative models for program trading at the hedge fund of D. E. Shaw & Co. Kamath later started Efficient Frontier (company) and applied the same portfolio optimization techniques to the area of online advertising. Kamath headed the algorithms and optimization work at Efficient Frontier until its acquisition by Adobe Systems. At Adobe, Anil Kamath runs the data science and machine learning group and is responsible for Adobe's data science collaborations with universities and Adobe's digital marketing research awards program
 
Before Efficient Frontier, Kamath founded eBoodle.com, an ecommerce company providing comparison shopping and digital wallet services, that was acquired by Bizrate (Shopzilla). At Bizrate, Kamath developed a contextual advertising product.

References

External links 
 Efficient Frontier
 Adobe
 Shopzilla

Living people
Businesspeople from Mumbai
Indian emigrants to the United States
IIT Bombay alumni
Stanford University alumni
American computer businesspeople
American technology chief executives
Silicon Valley people
American computer scientists
American people of Indian descent
1967 births